Öhringen (East Franconian: Ähringe) is the largest town in Hohenlohe (district) in the state of Baden-Württemberg, in southwest Germany, near Heilbronn. Öhringen is on the railline to Schwäbisch Hall and Crailsheim.

With a population of 24,374 (2019), the town is diverse. It is a quaint medieval place, and, among its ancient buildings, boasts a fine Evangelical church containing carvings in cedar-wood from the 15th century and numerous interesting tombs and monuments; a Renaissance town hall; the building, now used as a library, which formerly belonged to a monastery, erected in 1034; and a palace, the former residence of the princes of Hohenlohe-Öhringen.

 Vicus Aurelii to the Romans. Eastwards of it runs the old limes Roman frontier wall, and numerous remains and inscriptions dating from the days of the Roman settlement have been discovered, including traces of three camps.

Geography

Geographical location
Öhringen is located in the western, deeper part of the Hohenlohe plain, between the Keuper stage of the Swabian-Franconian Forest and the Kocher valley. The town spreads out over the flat valley of the Ohrn, a small river, which flows about  down the valley in the district Ohrnberg into the Kocher river.

The Ohrn has created a broad, flat valley in the northwest of the borough and at Möhrig. From Unterohrn, the Ohrn extends to the confluence with the Kocher in the hard layers of the mussel limestone and has cut a deep valley. This section of the river course was declared Ohrntal in 1963 for the conservation area. The Maßholderbach and the Westernbach streams, which flow northwest of the town itself in the Ohrn, also create flat valleys in the northeastern part of the district.

The nature reserve Viehweide Michelbach is on the Michelbach section.

Öhringen is situated on the southwestern edge of the East Frankish language area, whereby the special Öhringer dialect influences can be identified from Rhenish Franconian and Swabian.

Geology
Geologically considered, the Hohenlohe-level is part of the southwest German Schichtstufenlandes (cuesta country) and belongs to the Triassic landscape. It is one of a band with varying breadth from the south-eastern edge of the Black Forest on the Franconian Gäubucht up to Franconia in the north extending to Gäuflächen and passes north and east into the Bauland region, the Tauber Valley, and the Haller Plain. The Hohenlohe plane itself includes the area around the Kocher river and Jagst river, to the foot of the mountains and Keuper forest, and is a forest-poor and fertile old farmland.

In the subsurface are the layers of the Muschelkalk period, on the wide open spaces of layers of the Lower Keuper and are partially covered by loam. The most hard rock of the Muschelkalk in Tauber, Kocher, and its many tributaries of the Jagst river have cut and made it close, varied and scenic valley portions. The Gäufläche is framed in the southern semicircle of the forests of the Löwenstein, Waldburger Limpurger and mountains and dominates it.[7]

The Stufenbildner is mainly on reeds, gravel and sandstone, because of waterlogging little, but are mainly forested. By fluvial erosion of the edge of the Keuper forest mountains over time has been divided into several sections with spur-like projections. In some places individual mountains were separated, at Öhringen: the Golberg, the Verrenberg (205 m) and the Lindelberg. The landscape around Öhringen shares two important elements of the Southwest German cuesta country: the Gäuplatten and the Keuper forest mountains.

The limestone in the subsurface of Hohenlohe and Haller is widely karstified, as evidenced by more than 2,000 sinkholes, many dry valleys and a few cave systems. In several limestone quarries, the rock is mined and usually broken into gravel, even in the town of Öhringen (at Unterohrn). However, the limestone deposited in a little water-permeable layer nor Lower Keuper, which prevents a rapid infiltration of precipitation in the limestone. Moreover, as the Lower Keuper often has loess, this has created mineral-rich, arable soil easy to work with sufficient moisture.

The area surrounding Öhringen is strongly influenced by agriculture. Besides the cultivation of cereals, sugar beet, cabbage, corn, and rapeseed, the orchards and vineyards give the landscape for mi around its typical character.

Climate

Hohenlohe is part of the warm temperate Central European climate, with still predominantly maritime character. The changing topography on a small scale, especially between valley and high altitude, also causes the climate varying greatly from place to place. The monthly average for January and July are on Keuper height by about one to two degrees lower. These temperature differences are especially clear in the winter, when snow still lies on the heights, but it is melted away in the plane already. The arrival of spring, with the beginning of the apple blossoms, is around May 4 in Öhringen, further to the east later, further west earlier. The German Weather Service operates a weather station in Öhringen.

Neighbouring communities
The following towns and villages – clockwise (starting from the north) – border the town of Öhringen: Forchtenberg, Zweiflingen, Neuenstein, Waldenburg, Pfedelbach and Bretzfeld (all Hohenlohe district), likewise Langenbrettach and Hardthausen am Kocher (both Heilbronn district). Together with Pfedelbach and Zweiflingen, Öhringen decides administrative matters. Öhringen advises and supports the other two municipalities in carrying out their duties, as well as technical issues of building and civil engineering works and the maintenance and expansion of the water of the second order.

Öhringen is a secondary centre of the region of Heilbronn-Franken; in the city of Heilbronn is a designated regional centre. The central region near the town Öhringen also includes the cities and towns Bretzfeld, Neuenstein, Waldenburg, Pfedelbach and Zweiflingen (all Hohenlohe).

Subdivisions 

The urban areas of Öhringen consists of the town itself (German: Kernstadt) and the outlying villages of Baumerlenbach, Büttelbronn, Cappel, Eckartsweiler, Michelbach am Wald, Möglingen, Ohrnberg, Schwöllbronn und Verrenberg, which were incorporated only in the regional reform of the 1970s. All unincorporated communities were part of the county from 1973 to Öhringen or its successor, the District of Hohenlohe.

The neighbourhoods are also places in the meaning of the Municipal Code of Baden-Württemberg with an Ortschaftsrat and a mayor as chairman. The village councils are elected at each municipal election of the voting-age population of the village and are important to hear matters concerning the village. Every town has a local administrative body of the municipality.

Demographics

Mayors
1887–1906: Schäufele (was Stadtschultheiß in Kupferzell before)
1906–1918: Albert Meyder
1919–1945: Peter Berner
1945–1948: Wilhelm Rösch
1948–1954: Franz Illenberger
1954–1967: Richard Laidig
1967–1987: Ulrich Fahrenbruch
1987–2009: Jochen K. Kübler
Since 2009: Thilo Michler
The mayor is  Thilo Michler (independent). Before, he was the mayor of Zaberfeld, and he was elected in June 2009 with 60.7% of the vote.

Culture and sightseeing

Museums
 The Weygang Museum is a museum of local history, with a tin and faience collection from the Roman era.
 The Museum Werkstatt Pflaumer gives one a chance to take a look at the locksmith and grinding professions.
 The Meeres (Sea) Museum (in Cappel) – gives the viewer a chance to look at the most beautiful mussels and snail shells from seas all over the world.

Architecture 
The Medieval marketplace is the heart of the town. Here stands the castle of Hohenlohe (German: Schloss), the attraction of the town, which is now used as the Town Hall. Close by is the Protestant church (Stiftskirche).

Other churches in Öhringen include the Spitalkirche St. Anna und Elisabeth (now Protestant, built in 1376), the cemetery chapel of St. Anna (built in 1520, also Protestant), and the Catholic Church of St. Joseph (1961).

Other things to see in the centre of the town are Upper (Obere-) Gate (1792), the old Deanery, the guesthouse of the Roman Emperor, the Yellow Castle, and the Tierhofgarten (a large garden with zoo animals).

2006 home of the Socceroos
During the 2006 FIFA World Cup, the Australia national soccer team, "The Socceroos" based their pre-game training in the town. The Socceroos trained at the stadium of local football club TSG Öhringen, whose pitch has been relaid at a cost of $335,000, and stayed at the five-star Wald-und-Schlosshotel, a former hunting lodge, in nearby Friedrichsruhe.

The Australians were given an official reception by Öhringen's Mayor, Jochen Kübler. "We are friends to the Australia team," he said. "We hope they will get more power from the region."

The team finished second in Brazil-dominated Group F, but fell in the Round of 16 against Italy by a controversial penalty in the final minutes of the match.

Twin towns – sister cities

Öhringen is twinned with:
 Großenhain, Germany
 Kędzierzyn-Koźle, Poland
 Treffen am Ossiacher See, Austria

Notable people
Johann Ludwig Christ (1739–1813), pastor and fruit expert
Friedrich Christoph Dietrich (1779–1847), lithograph and copper cutcher
Julius Weizsäcker (1828–1889), historian
Karl Friedrich Schall (1859–1925), fine mechanic and co-founder of the company Cleaner, Gebbert & Schall in Erlangen 
Otto Röhm (1876–1939), pharmacist, developed and produced as one of the first polymethylmethacrylate and invented the Brand  Plexiglas 
Oswald Lutz (1876–1944), officer, most recently general of the Panzertruppe
August Lösch (1906–1945), economist and social scientist
Reinhold Würth (born 1935), entrepreneur (Würth)
Hartmut Weber (born 1945), historian and archivar, President of the German Federal Archives 1999–2011
Georg Klein (born 1964), composer, sound and media artist

Associated with the town
Wendel Hipler (1465–1526), led the farmers' parliament in Heilbronn as a peasant chancellor

Sources

References

Hohenlohe (district)
Württemberg